is a public university in Mihama-ku, Chiba, Chiba Prefecture, Japan. It was established in 2009 by integrating Chiba College of Health Science (present-day Makuhari Campus, founded in 1981) with Chiba Prefectural College of Allied Medical Science (present-day Nitona Campus).

Organization

Undergraduate schools 
 Faculty of Health Care Sciences
 Department of Nursing (Makuhari Campus)
 Department of Nutrition (Makuhari Campus)
 Department of Dental Hygiene (Makuhari Campus)
 Department of Rehabilitation Sciences (Nitona Campus)

References

External links 
  

Public universities in Japan
Universities and colleges in Chiba Prefecture
Educational institutions established in 2009
2009 establishments in Japan